Claro Pellosis (28 November 1934 – 21 July 2019) was a Filipino sprinter. He competed in the men's 400 meters at the 1960 Summer Olympics.

Pellosis, despite being more reputed in the 400 meters event, was part of the 4x100 meters relay team that won the gold medal for the Philippines at the 1962 Asian Games. He along with his teammates Rogelio Onofre, Isaac Gómez, and Remegio Vista, were the second and last people to win a 4x100 meters relay event for the Philippines in the Asian Games.

He was also an athletics instructor to students and Physical Education teachers. He also helped national athlete Lydia de Vega win the women's 100 meters events at the 1986 Asian Games by assisting her father and coach Tatang de Vega. He assisted Tatang de Vega until the retirement of the latter's daughter in 1994.

By 2003, Pellosis was already a director of athletics events. In the same year his house in Paco, Manila was burned in a fire.

In 21 July 2019, Pellosis died after suffering a cardiac arrest while having lunch with his family. He was rushed to the Manila Doctors Hospital where attempts to revive him were unsuccessful.

References

External links
 

1934 births
2019 deaths
Athletes (track and field) at the 1960 Summer Olympics
Athletes (track and field) at the 1964 Summer Olympics
Filipino male sprinters
Olympic track and field athletes of the Philippines
Place of birth missing
Asian Games medalists in athletics (track and field)
Asian Games gold medalists for the Philippines
Athletes (track and field) at the 1962 Asian Games
Medalists at the 1962 Asian Games